Nathan Richmond (born 6 July 1979) is an athlete from New Zealand.  He competes in triathlon.

Richmond competed in Triathlon at the 2004 Summer Olympics.  He placed thirty-third with a total time of 1:58:01.94.

References

New Zealand male triathletes
Triathletes at the 2004 Summer Olympics
1979 births
Living people
People educated at Saint Kentigern College
Olympic triathletes of New Zealand
20th-century New Zealand people
21st-century New Zealand people